Harutaeographa adusta is a moth of the family Noctuidae. It is found in Indochina and Thailand.

References

Moths described in 1999
Orthosiini